Kammangadu  is a village in the Aranthangi Revenue block of Pudukkottai district. Pincode 614616, Tamil Nadu, India.

Demographics 

As per the 2001 census, Kammakadu had a total population of 
493 with 230 males and 263 females. Out of the total  
population 319 people were literate.

References

Villages in Pudukkottai district